Atari Video Cube is a puzzle video game developed by GCC for the Atari 2600 and published by Atari, Inc. in 1982. Atari Video Cube was sold exclusively through the Atari Club, run by Atari, Inc. Originally an unlicensed interpretation of the Rubik's Cube toy, Atari rereleased the game in 1984 as Rubik's Cube.

Gameplay

The game implements a Pocket Cube, Rubik's Cube, and Rubik's Revenge. The player takes control of "Hubie the Cube Master" as he tries to solve a scrambled "Video Cube".  Hubie's method for solving the cube is to pick up the colored segments one-by-one and place them in their correct spaces. Picking up a square, however, limits Hubie's movements; He cannot move onto a square that matches the color of the one he is carrying.

The game manual encourages players to try and solve the cube in as few moves as possible, with their total number of moves being counted at the bottom of the screen. Atari Video Cube has several game modes that alter the difficulty of the game, such as square count and color range.

References

External links
 

1982 video games
Atari 2600 games
Video games based on Hasbro toys
Video games developed in the United States